The 1995–96 Ohio Bobcats men's basketball team represented Ohio University in the college basketball season of 1995–96. The team was coached by Larry Hunter and played their home games at the Convocation Center. They finished the season 16–14 and finished fourth in the MAC regular season with a conference record of 11–7.

Roster

Schedule

|-
!colspan=9 style=|Non-conference regular season

|-
!colspan=12 style=| MAC regular season

|-
!colspan=9 style=| MAC Tournament

Source:

Statistics

Team Statistics
Final 1995–96 Statistics

Source

Player statistics

Source

References

Final 1996 Division I Men's Basketball Statistics Report
Ohio Record Book

Ohio Bobcats men's basketball seasons
Ohio
Bob
Bob